Erich Hintzsche (26 August 1900 – 20 July 1975) was a Swiss physician and historian most notable for his studies on Albrecht von Haller's contribution to medicine history.

Publications
Guilelmus Fabricius Hildanus. Rheinischer Kreis, November 6, 1982, Hilden.
Editor of Albrecht von Hallers Briefe an Auguste Tissot [?]: 1754-1777. Bern/Stuttgart/Wien: Huber, 1977.  (review, Journal of the History of Medicine and Allied Sciences Book Reviews, vol.XXII, Nr.2, p. 205-206, 1967.
Editor of “Albrecht Hallers Tagebücher seiner Reisen nach Deutschland, Holland und England: 1723-1727”, Berner Beiträge zur Geschichte der Medizin und der Naturwissenschaften, vol. 4. Bern/Stuttgart/Wien: Huber, 1971.
“Medizin und Mediziner seit 1870”, Schweizerische Medizinische Wochenschrift, Basel/Stuttgart: Schwabe AG, 1971. 
Editor of: Albrecht von Haller: Tagebuch seiner Studienreise nach London, Paris, Strassburg und Basel: 1727 - 1728. Berner Beiträge zur Geschichte der Medizin und der Naturwissenschaften, vol. 2. Bern/Stuttgart: Huber, 1968.
With Hermann Rennefahrt. 600 Jahre Inselspital: 1354-1954. Bern: Hans Huber, 1954.

Further reading
Marcel H. Bickel. Henry E. Sigerist: Vier ausgewählte Briefwechsel mit Medizinhistorikern der Schweiz. Bern: Peter Lang, 2008, p. 533-594. 
 Urs Boschung. “Erich Hintzsche, 1900-1975. Nachruf mit Gesamtbibliographie.” Gesnerus 32, 1975, p. 293-314.
 Curt Hallauer. “In memoriam Prof. Dr. med. Erich Hintzsche (1900-1975).” Schweizerische Medizinische Wochenschrift 105, 1975, p. 1196.
 Ewald R. Weibel. “Prof. Erich Hintzsche zum 70. Geburtstag.” Schweizerische Medizinische Wochenschrift 100, 1970, p. 1466-1467.

1900 births
1975 deaths
Swiss medical historians
University of Halle alumni
Academic staff of the University of Bern
20th-century Swiss physicians